Douera Sportpark Stadium is 40,000 capacity stadium currently under construction in Douéra, Algeria, a suburb of Algiers. It is expected to serve as the home stadium of MC Alger.

Construction
The works were supposed to start in 2010 and end in 2012 by a Chinese company with a capacity of 40,000 spectators, but it was delayed due to administrative problems around the land on which it will be built. The floor was changed to start the work officially in July 2014, Like all new stadiums in Algeria Lag is a prominent feature, at the end of 2018, works were completed on the first floor, after which work was started on the second floor, which is running fast compared to the first floor or other new stadiums with the spread of Coronavirus in China, Algerian officials stated that there may be delays in handing over the stadium, since most of the workers are from China. 

On August 8, 2021 the President of the Republic Abdelmadjid Tebboune has announced that the management of the new stadium will be for MC Alger. As he recalled the founding of the Club on August 7, 1921 by the late Abderrahmane Aouf, and returned to the team's obstacle course and its stoppage before and during the Algerian war. The rate of progress of the stadium's work has reached around 55%, according to the 2020 activity report presented last February by the Ministry of Youth and Sports. For several years, several Algerian clubs including USM Alger, CR Belouizdad and MC Alger have been asking that one of the two new football stadiums under construction in Baraki and Douera be awarded to them. In December 2022, work began to raise the stadium screens, which will be two giant screens, and also start installing chairs where the red and green colors were chosen.

Tenants and events

Transport connections

See also

List of football stadiums in Algeria
List of African stadiums by capacity
List of association football stadiums by capacity

References

Football venues in Algeria
Stadiums under construction
Buildings and structures in Algiers Province